Aviators Field may refer to the following arenas in Seattle:

 Las Vegas Ballpark
 Fairgrounds Field